Boris Leonidovich Altshuler (born 27 January 1955, Leningrad, USSR) is a professor of theoretical physics at Columbia University. His specialty is theoretical condensed matter physics.

Education and career
Altshuler attended State Secondary School 489 in Saint Petersburg. He received his diploma in physics from Leningrad State University in 1976. Altshuler continued on at the Leningrad Institute for Nuclear Physics, where he was awarded his Ph.D. in physics in 1979. Altshuler stayed at the institute for the next ten years as a research fellow.

In 1989, Altshuler joined the faculty of the Massachusetts Institute of Technology. While there, he received the Hewlett-Packard Europhysics Prize (now called the Agilent Physics Prize) and became a fellow of the American Physical Society.

Altshuler left MIT in 1996 to take a professorship at Princeton University. While there, he became affiliated with NEC Laboratories America. Recently, Altshuler has joined the faculty of Columbia and continues to work with the NEC Labs.

Research
Althuler's contributions to condensed matter physics are broad and manifold. He is particularly famous for his work on disordered electronic systems, where he was the first to calculate singular quantum interference corrections to electron transport due to interactions (Altshuler-Aronov corrections). Together with Aronov, he has also developed theory of dephasing in weak-localization. In collaboration with Boris Shklovskii, Althsuler developed the theory of level repulsion in disordered metals.

He has also significantly contributed to the theory of universal conduction fluctuations. More recently, Altshuler and Igor Aleiner have pioneered the new field of many-body localization, where they showed that an interacting many-body system may remain localized - a phenomenon descending from the famous phenomenon of Anderson localization. The latter achievement of Altshuler and Aleiner is widely regarded as a major milestone and many-body localization, they introduced, has now developed into a flourishing new field of physics. In 2016, the predicted phenomenon of many-body localization was observed experimentally by the group of Immanuel Bloch in Munich, Germany.

Awards and honors
1993: Hewlett-Packard Europhysics Prize
1993: Became a fellow of the American Physical Society
1996: Fellow of the American Academy of Arts and Sciences
2002: Elected to the National Academy of Sciences
2003: Oliver E. Buckley Prize of the American Physical Society
Elected to the Norwegian Academy of Science and Letters
2017: Dirac Medal (Dirac Medal for the Advancement of Theoretical Physics, awarded by the University of New South Wales)
2019: Simons Fellow 
2022: Lars Onsager Prize of the American Physical Society

References

Further reading
Boris Altshuler's Page at Columbia University
Boris Altshuler "50 years of Anderson Localization":  Lecture 1, Lecture 2, Lecture 3 (June 2010, Zelenogorsk, Saint Petersburg)

1955 births
Living people
Scientists from Saint Petersburg
Saint Petersburg State University alumni
Soviet physicists
20th-century American physicists
Moscow Helsinki Group
Columbia University faculty
Fellows of the American Academy of Arts and Sciences
Fellows of the American Physical Society
Members of the Norwegian Academy of Science and Letters
Members of the United States National Academy of Sciences
Oliver E. Buckley Condensed Matter Prize winners
Massachusetts Institute of Technology School of Science faculty
Princeton University faculty